Parhyale  is a genus of amphipod crustaceans, containing the following species:
Parhyale aquilina (Costa, 1853)
Parhyale basrensis Salman, 1986
Parhyale eburnea Krapp-Schickel, 1974
Parhyale explorator Arresti, 1989
Parhyale fascigera Stebbing, 1897
Parhyale hachijoensis Hiwatari, 2002
Parhyale hawaiensis (Dana, 1853)
Parhyale inyacka K. H. Barnard, 1916
Parhyale iwasai (Shoemaker, 1956)
Parhyale multispinosa Stock, 1987
Parhyale penicillata Shoemaker, 1956
Parhyale philippinensis Hiwatari, 2002
Parhyale plumicornis (Heller, 1866)
Parhyale ptilocerus (Derzhavin, 1937)

References

Gammaridea
Taxa named by Thomas Roscoe Rede Stebbing